James Lloyd Greenfield (born 16 July 1924) served as  United States Assistant Secretary of State for Public Affairs from 1962 to 1966 and was one of the editors of the New York Times who decided to publish the Pentagon Papers in 1971.

Early life and education
Born in Cleveland in 1924, Greenfield attended high school at Cleveland Heights High School, graduating in 1942.  He then went on to receive a B.A. from Harvard College.

Career
After college, Greenfield became a foreign correspondent for Time, with postings in Asia, Europe and Washington.  He rose to become Time'''s chief diplomatic correspondent.

Greenfield joined the United States Department of State during the Kennedy administration as Deputy Assistant Secretary of State for Public Affairs.  In 1964, President of the United States Lyndon Johnson promoted Greenfield to Assistant Secretary of State for Public Affairs and Greenfield held this office from September 10, 1964 until March 12, 1966.

After leaving the administration, Greenfield became Vice President of Continental Airlines, then owned by its founder Bob Six, and founded Air Micronesia for Continental which gave the airline a route to Asia.   He also worked as News Director of WINS-NY radio station where he set up 24-hour news for the station's pioneering all-news programming.

Greenfield joined the New York Times in 1967 as assistant metropolitan editor.  From 1969 to 1977, he was the Times' foreign news editor, and was the project editor during the publication of the Pentagon Papers, for which the New York Times won the Pulitzer Prize for Public Service.  He became an assistant managing editor in 1977.  In 1987, the New York Times announced that Greenfield would become editor of The New York Times Magazine, while remaining an assistant managing editor of the Times. In 1991, Greenfield stepped down as assistant managing editor, though he remained a consulting member of the editorial board.

Greenfield is a founder of The Independent Journalism Foundation and has served in a volunteer capacity as its President since its founding in 1991.  IJF is a nonprofit organization that operates centers and related training programs for the media in Eastern Europe and Southeast Asia.

Personal life
In the early 1950s, while posted in Hong Kong for Time'', Greenfield met his future first wife, Margaret Ann Schwertley (December 23, 1924 – December 8, 1999), who was a Pan Am stewardess based out of Hong Kong; the couple wed in 1954. Beginning in the 1950s, she was an art and antiques dealer in London, Washington and finally New York, where until 1998 she owned and ran Marco Polo, a store located on Madison Avenue between E. 84th and E. 85th Streets in Manhattan.  The couple lived in the Upper East Side of Manhattan, and Greenfield and his wife also developed brownstone houses.

Greenfield is married to Ene Riisna Greenfield, an Emmy Award-winning former producer for ABC Television's 20/20.

References

1924 births
Living people
American newspaper reporters and correspondents
United States Assistant Secretaries of State
Editors of New York City newspapers
The New York Times editors
Harvard College alumni
American male journalists
Cleveland Heights High School alumni